Badagoni Wine Company, previously known as Knight of Winemaking, is a Georgian wine producer. The company was founded in then Kakhetian village of Zemo Khodasheni (Akhmeta district) in 2002. Its products include such brands as Tsinandali, Mukuzani, Kindzmarauli, Gurjaani, Saperavi, Akhasheni and more. In addition, then company makes Kakhetian Noble — a special wine made in cooperation with Donato Lanati, an Italian enologist.

See also 
Georgian wine
List of Georgian wine appellations

References

External links 
 

Wineries of Georgia (country)
Georgian wine
Brands of Georgia (country)